Criccieth Golf Club (Welsh: Clwb Golff Cricieth) was a golf club based just outside Criccieth at Gwynedd, Wales. A 5787-yard-long, 18 hole hilltop course with par 69 and SSS of 68. The club opened in 1905. In 2015 the club was named among Bryn Terfel's favourite courses in the “Wales Golf Annual Brochure”. This club has a "members only" policy.

References

Criccieth
Golf clubs and courses in Wales
Golf club